The National Museum of Art of Romania is located in the Royal Palace in Revolution Square, central Bucharest. It features collections of medieval and modern Romanian art, as well as the international collection assembled by the Romanian royal family.

The exhibition "Shadows and Light" ran from 15 July to 2 October 2005. With four centuries of French art, it was the largest exhibition of French painting in Central and Eastern Europe since 1945. 77 works were exhibited, including masterpieces by painters such as Poussin, Chardin, Ingres, David, Delacroix, Corot, Cézanne, Matisse, Picasso, and Braque.

History

The museum was damaged during the 1989 Romanian Revolution that led to the downfall of Nicolae Ceaușescu. In 2000, part of the museum reopened to the public, housing the modern Romanian collection and the international collection; the comprehensive Medieval art collection, which now features works salvaged from monasteries destroyed during the Ceaușescu era, reopened in spring 2002. There are also two halls that house temporary exhibits.

The modern Romanian collection features sculptures by Constantin Brâncuși and Dimitrie Paciurea, as well as paintings by Theodor Aman, Nicolae Grigorescu, Theodor Pallady, Gheorghe Petrașcu, and Gheorghe Tattarescu.

The international collection includes works by Old Masters such as Domenico Veneziano, El Greco, Tintoretto, Jan van Eyck, Jan Brueghel the Elder, Peter Paul Rubens, and Rembrandt, plus a smattering of works by impressionists such as Claude Monet and Alfred Sisley. Among the best known Old Master works in the collection are Jacopo Amigoni's portrait of the singer Farinelli, a Crucifixion by Antonello da Messina, and Alonso Cano's Christ at the Column.

Exhibitions

In the southern part of the building the European Museum Art Gallery was reopened in 2000. The painting collection was made available on the basis of 214 works of art from the collection of King Carol I, to which were added pictures of other members of the royal family. The king's collection included paintings by El Greco, Rembrandt, Bruegel the Elder, Rubens, and Domenico Veneziano.

In spring 2001, the Romanian Modern Art Gallery reopened. The paintings are displayed on the mezzanine and second floor wing of the building. Mezzanine Romanian painting works are exhibited early (Nicholas Polcovnicul, Eustathius Altini, Anton Chladek, Livaditti Niccolo Giovanni Schiavoni, Carol Wahlstein Constantin Daniel Rosenthal, John Negulici, Constantin Lecca, Carol Popp de Szathmary), along with portraits of family members and a few landscapes. 

 
In the Modern Romanian Section, the following painters are also represented:
 Nicolae Grigorescu
 Stefan Luchian
 Cecilia Cuțescu-Storck
 Nicolae Tonitza
 Herman Maxy
 Victor Brauner

Other noteworthy non-Romanian paintings are:
 Bernardino Licinio's "Return of Prodigal Son"
 Hans von Aachen's "3 Graces"
 Aegidius Sadeler's "Hall of Hradcany"
 Bartholomäus Zeitblom's "Saint Barbara"
 Claude Monet's "Camille in Green Dress"
 Paul Signac's "Gate"

Gallery

See also
 National Museum of Romanian History
 List of national galleries

References

External links

 Official site of the museum (Romanian, English)

Art museums and galleries in Bucharest
Historic monuments in Bucharest
National museums of Romania
Royal residences in Romania
Palaces in Bucharest
Cultural infrastructure completed in 1937
Calea Victoriei